The Stichometry of Nicephorus is a stichometry by Patriarch Nicephorus I of Constantinople. It is significant in that it counts the number of lines of various Christian texts, many of which have been lost over the course of time. This has enabled modern scholars to determine how much of various fragmentary texts from the New Testament apocrypha and Old Testament apocrypha remain missing.

External links
 The stichometry of Nicephorus (English, Greek, Latin)
 Teubner edition with critical apparatus in Nikephoros, Chronographikon syntomon in: Nicephori Archiepiscopi Constantinopolitani, Opuscula historica, ed. C. de Boor, Leipzig 1880, p. 80–135, esp. 132 – 135. (Greek, Internet Archive)
 In a collection of documents on the history of the Christian canon by E. Preuschen, Analecta (Freiberg and Leipzig: Mohr, 1893), pp. 156–8. (Greek, Internet Archive).

Apocrypha
Manuscripts